Edgar Anstey  (16 February 1907 in Watford, Hertfordshire, England – 26 September 1987 in London, England), was a leading British documentary film-maker.

Anstey was educated at Watford Grammar School for Boys and Birkbeck College. He spent a few years as a civil servant before starting in 1930 at The Empire Marketing Board's film unit, under the direction of John Grierson. In 1949, he joined the British Transport Films unit, which he headed until 1974. He was nominated for the Short Subject (Live Action) Academy Award in 1965 for the documentary film Snow. He directed Housing Problems in 1935.

See also
Alberto Cavalcanti
Arthur Elton
British Transport Films
John Grierson
Humphrey Jennings
Wolfgang Suschitzky

References

Further reading
  Nicholas Pronay, ‘Anstey, Edgar Harold Macfarlane (1907–1987)’, rev., Oxford Dictionary of National Biography, Oxford University Press, 2004, accessed 4 Oct 2007

External links
 British Universities Film & Video Council Website featuring a Podcast Interview with Edgar Anstey.

1907 births
1987 deaths
Alumni of Birkbeck, University of London
English documentary filmmakers
People educated at Watford Grammar School for Boys
People from Watford
Officers of the Order of the British Empire